Peter Cambor (born September 28, 1978) is an American actor, writer, and producer. He is best known for his portrayal of Barry on Grace and Frankie and operational psychologist Nate Getz on the CBS show NCIS: Los Angeles.

Cambor appeared on the former ABC sitcom Notes from the Underbelly for two seasons. In 2012, he starred in the TBS series Wedding Band.

Early life
Cambor studied at Deerfield Academy in Massachusetts and at Wesleyan University in Middletown, Connecticut, where he earned a BA degree in English in 2001. After further studies, Peter Cambor received an MFA from the American Repertory Theater's Institute for Advanced Theater Training at Harvard University, Cambridge, Massachusetts (MFA in Acting, 2005). After working for a while in New York, he moved to Los Angeles.

Career 
Cambor landed the lead as an expectant father on Notes from the Underbelly after the sitcom's creator saw his performance in a Los Angeles production of The Cherry Orchard opposite veteran actors Annette Bening and Alfred Molina. Cambor starred opposite Jennifer Westfeldt from 2006 to 2008.

Cambor played Sam in the 2018 film Forever My Girl.

Since 2009, Cambor has appeared as a recurring cast member on NCIS: Los Angeles as Nate Getz, an operations psychologist in the Office of Special Projects. The role originated during a two-episode arc of NCIS, "Legend (Part 1)" and "Legend (Part 2)".

Cambor has played the recurring role of Barry, Brianna's boyfriend, on Grace and Frankie since 2015. He also appears in some episodes of Suits as Nathan, director of a legal clinic.

Cambor is the co-founder of District 33, a production and development company in Los Angeles. He was an Executive Producer on the Quibi Documentary Series "Blackballed" about Donald Sterling's expulsion from the NBA for racist comments he made during the 2014 season.

References

External links
 TV Guide bio
 

1978 births
American male film actors
American male stage actors
American male television actors
Male actors from Houston
Living people
Deerfield Academy alumni
Wesleyan University alumni
Institute for Advanced Theater Training, Harvard University alumni